The 2nd Syracuse Grand Prix was a non-championship Formula Two motor race held in Syracuse, Sicily on 16 March 1952. Alberto Ascari, starting from pole, headed teammates Piero Taruffi and Giuseppe Farina in a Scuderia Ferrari 1-2-3. Luigi Villoresi set fastest lap in another works Ferrari.

Classification

Race

References

Syracuse
Syracuse Grand Prix
Syracuse
Syracuse